Mystic is an environmental  teen drama New Zealand television series produced by Libertine Pictures and Slim film+television for CBBC, TVNZ and the Seven Network.

Created by Amy Shindler and Beth Chalmers, it is based on Pony Club Secrets, Stacy Gregg's series of pony novels, the first of which is Mystic and the Midnight Ride (2007). Set on the fictional peninsula of Kauri Point, New Zealand, Mystic tells the story of Issie Brown and her new-found friendships with the town's teen horse riders, and their efforts to save Kauri Point from an industrial development that threatens it. It stars Macey Chipping. The series premiered on CBBC and BBC iPlayer in the UK on 14 July 2020. After the first season had aired, Mystic was renewed for two more seasons.

Cast and characters

 Macey Chipping as Issie Brown. Having just moved from London to Kauri Point, she struggles to make friends and misses her old home. However, a chance encounter with wild ponies Blaze and Mystic convinces her to stay.
 Laura Patch as Amanda Brown, Issie's mother.
 Cathy Downes as Mitch, Amanda's mother and Issie's grandmother.
 Phil Brown as Sam Tucker, father of Natasha Tucker.
 Kirk Torrance as Tom Avery
 Jonny Brugh as Kenny Burford, mayor of Kauri Point.
 Antonia Robinson as Natasha Tucker, one of Kauri Point's teen riders.
 Max Crean as Dan Townley, one of Kauri Point's teen riders.
 Jacqueline Joe as Caroline Burford, one of Kauri Point's teen riders.
 Joshua Tan as Caleb Burford, one of Kauri Point's teen riders.
 Harriet Walton as Stella Tarrant, one of Kauri Point's teen riders.
 Romy Mukerjee as Anisha
 Milo Cawthorne as Adam
 Katlyn Wong as Corinne
 Anais Shand as Dora
 Kelson Henderson as Jake
 Carrie Green as Miriama
 Alison Bruce as Julia
 Xander Manktelow as Hamish Tarrant
 Madeleine Adams as Bianca, Dulmoth Park Rider
 Annise Boothroyd as Nicole, Dulmoth Park Rider

Production
On 2 October 2018, NZ on Air announced their decision to fund 13 28-minute episodes of Mystic for up to $1,000,000.

Gilly Poole, Suzanne Crowley and Tina Cleary were the series' casting directors. On 10 March 2020, it was announced that Macey Chipping and Laura Patch would play Issie Brown and her mother respectively, alongside a New Zealand cast of Phil Brown, Jacqueline Joe, Kirk Torrance, Cathy Downes, Jonny Brugh, Antonia Robinson, Max Crean, Josh Tan and Harriet Walton.

The series was scheduled to start filming in New Zealand in January 2020, and on 10 March 2020, it was revealed that filming had begun in Auckland, New Zealand. Filming halted when New Zealand went into lockdown in response to the COVID-19 pandemic, and on 5 April 2020, the BBC reported that Chipping had temporarily returned to the UK. Eight episodes from the first season were completed pre-COVID, with the other five completed during the pandemic. After the first series had completed airing, Mystic was renewed for second and third seasons. In February 2022, it was announced by Up TV that the show would premiere as part of the original programming catalog of its streaming service platform Up Faith & Family in April, followed by its linear debut 2 months later on June 2, 2022, airing after Heartland. The second season was released on January 5, 2023. The series is also on Amazon Prime in the United States.

Episodes

Series 1 (2020–2021)

Series 2 (2021)

Series 3 (2022)

References

External links
 
 Mystic on CBBC

2020 British television series debuts
2020s British children's television series
2020s British drama television series
British fantasy television series
2020s British LGBT-related drama television series
2020 New Zealand television series debuts
2020s New Zealand television series
CBBC shows
New Zealand children's television series
New Zealand drama television series
New Zealand fantasy television series
New Zealand LGBT-related television shows
Television productions suspended due to the COVID-19 pandemic
Television shows about psychic powers
Television series about families
Television series about teenagers